Paul Tant (4 April 1945 – 1 March 2014) was a Belgian politician. He was a member of Christen-Democratisch en Vlaams. He was mayor of Kruishoutem from 1977 until 2009.

He studied at Ghent University, where he earned a degree in political science. He was a longtime professor at Ipsoc. He was mayor of Kruishoutem from 1977 until 2009. Tant served in the Chamber of Representatives from 1981 to 1987 and again from 1991 until 2007. Between his two terms in the Chamber of Representatives he served from 1989 to 1991 in the Senate.

He died at the age of 68 on 1 March 2014.

References

1945 births
2014 deaths
Ghent University alumni
Christian Democratic and Flemish politicians
Mayors of places in Belgium
Members of the Chamber of Representatives (Belgium)
Members of the Senate (Belgium)